Grosse Pointe is an American sitcom television series which aired on The WB from September 22, 2000, to February 18, 2001, during the 2000–2001 television season. Created by Darren Star, it was a satire depicting the behind-the-scenes drama on the set of a television show, and was inspired in large part by Star's experiences as the creator and producer of the nighttime soap Beverly Hills, 90210.

Series overview
The series takes place in Los Angeles, on the set of a fictitious WB nighttime soap, also called Grosse Pointe, and several characters were based on real-life actors. The fictitious Grosse Pointe ("a misguided 90210 rip-off", as Star describes it) is set in the wealthy Michigan suburb, and was very much a parody of teenage nighttime soaps.

Reportedly, Beverly Hills 90210 producer Aaron Spelling called WB executive Jamie Kellner to complain about Lindsay Sloane's character Marcy Sternfeld, who in the original pilot was a thinly veiled parody of Spelling's daughter, actress Tori Spelling.

Darren Star asked several actors from Spelling-produced shows to appear on the series. Jason Priestley and Joe E. Tata from Beverly Hills, 90210 appeared in separate episodes, with Priestley directing the episode in which he appeared. Kristin Davis from Melrose Place and Sex and the City also appeared in an episode. Katie Wagner, who hosted a Beverly Hills, 90210 special in 1993, also appeared on the show as herself for one episode. Former Saved by the Bell teen star Elizabeth Berkley appeared in the series finale.

In addition, several actors from other WB series appeared as themselves on Grosse Pointe, such as Leslie Bibb and Carly Pope of Popular and Sarah Michelle Gellar of Buffy the Vampire Slayer.

Broadcast
Grosse Pointe was on the WB's Friday line-up in between Sabrina the Teenage Witch and Popular. The show lost much of the lead-in audience, and was moved to Sundays (a joke in the episode "The Opposite of Sex" references this, as the fictional show garners its highest ratings ever but fails to "beat Sabrina"). Grosse Pointe was canceled in February 2001 after 17 episodes.

Cast
 Irene Molloy: Hunter Fallow / Becky Johnson (a parody of Shannen Doherty and her 90210 character Brenda Walsh)
 William Ragsdale: Rob Fields (a parody of Darren Star)
 Al Santos: Johnny Bishop / Brad Johnson (a parody of Jason Priestley and 90210'''s Brandon Walsh)
 Lindsay Sloane: Marcy Sternfeld / Kim Peterson / Lynn (originally a parody of Tori Spelling)
 Bonnie Somerville: Courtney Scott / Laura Johnson (Courtney is a parody of Jennie Garth; her character Laura is a parody of Tiffani-Amber Thiessen's 90210 character Valerie Malone, a replacement character)
 Kohl Sudduth: Quentin Barbary King / Stone Anders (a parody of Luke Perry and 90210's Dylan McKay)
 Kyle Howard: Dave May ("Dave the Stand-in") (a parody of Brian Austin Green and 90210's David Silver)

 Episodes 

 Critical and public reaction 
Critics were largely positive towards Grosse Pointe. Time wrote that it was "nicely cast and smartly paced, it's a sassy, catty riot." The New York Daily News wrote that it was "the funniest, smartest comedy" that the WB has ever had. It was the only WB comedy to receive an "A" grade from Entertainment Weekly.

Despite this, the series struggled with low ratings. In its Friday night timeslot, it typically lost an average of one million viewers from its lead-in, Sabrina, the Teenage Witch. Though the network tried to find an audience for it by moving it around the schedule, Grosse Pointe ultimately failed to attract enough viewers to sustain it past one season.

Home media
On the DVD audio commentary for the Grosse Pointe pilot episode, Star explained that the behind-the-scenes antics on the set of 90210 were often more interesting than the show itself, and that the idea of creating a comedy based on this had been kicking around in his head for years.

In January 2006, Sony Pictures Home Entertainment announced that Grosse Pointe would be released on DVD on March 14, 2006. The DVD was later quietly taken off the schedule, and several months later, it was announced that it would be released as an Amazon.com exclusive on November 7, 2006. However, it was delayed yet again, but the DVD finally shipped in late November.

On December 4, 2006, Sony announced that the DVD would be widely released on February 13, 2007.

The opening titles and theme song only appear once on each disc of the DVD set, in the pilot episode for disc 1 and in "Puppet Master" for disc 2, because the use of "Sex Bomb" by Tom Jones was deemed too expensive to use in every episode. All other episodes had to be reedited to remove the opening titles. The cast credits, along with episode names, are shown over each episode's opening scene instead. The version of the titles that is used on DVDs is the standard version seen throughout the series not the original pilot version which featured Joely Fisher or the final version which included Nat Faxon.

DVD extras include an interview with Darren Star and commentary tracks on the following episodes:

 "Pilot" (with Darren Star)
 "Devil in a Blue Dress" (with Darren Star and co-executive producer Robin Schiff)
 "Satisfaction" (with Darren Star and Robin Schiff)
 "Secrets and Lies" (with Darren Star and Robin Schiff)

The DVD release jacket of disc 2 has a misprint with two of the episode descriptions. Star Wars description says that Marcy gets a restraining order to stop Quentin's harassment; it is actually Hunter who gets the restraining order. End of the Affair'' description says that Dave looks for the courage to break up with Marcy; again, it is actually Hunter that he is trying to break up with.

References

External links
 
 

2000 American television series debuts
2001 American television series endings
2000s American single-camera sitcoms
2000s American teen sitcoms
English-language television shows
Television series about television
Television series by Sony Pictures Television
Television shows set in Los Angeles
The WB original programming
Television series created by Darren Star
Television series about show business